Bandits is a 1997 German road movie directed by Katja von Garnier. The film stars Katja Riemann, Jasmin Tabatabai, Nicolette Krebitz and Jutta Hoffmann. Both the film and soundtrack album were commercially successful in Germany, but Bandits grossed less than $25,000 in the United States.  Much of the soundtrack was written and performed by the actresses themselves. The soundtrack reached number one in the German album charts.

Plot
As part of socio-professional reintegration in a German prison, four women form a band named Bandits. Drummer Emma Moor, a former member of a Jazz group, was abused by the bandleader and shot him. Angelika Angel Kleinschmidt is imprisoned for marriage fraud, she plays the bass. Singer and guitarist Ludmilla Luna Nabiba was arrested for aggravated robbery. Marie Irrgang poisoned her husband, is schizoid and suicidal, she plays the piano.

On the way to a performance at a prom the band manages to escape from custody. On their way towards Hamburg they hear one of their own songs on the radio, which they sent to record producer Michael Gold. Due to the media attention the Bandits gained, Gold senses profitable business. The four women trick him into paying them without signing the contract he offers, financially securing their escape.

In light of their growing fanbase, the Bandits play a spontaneous concert in a club, however they are interrupted by the police. To evade arrest, they take the American tourist West hostage. The good-looking male causes faction within the group, as he seduces both Angel and Luna. The Bandits leave him behind soon after.

With the police led by Kommissar Schwarz still chasing them, they get surrounded on a bridge. Marie dies of a natural death, and the other bandmembers set the car on fire. Luna and Angel jump into the river, while Emma gets arrested. Soon after, she is freed by the other musicians. With the help of a contact Marie had, they concoct a plan play a gig on a cruise liner and thereby leave the country.

Prior to their departure the Bandits play a farewell show on a rooftop in the harbor. As the police is informed about this, Kommissar Schwarz and a Sondereinsatzkommando rush to the scene. Constrained by the audience and makeshift barriers, the SEK reaches the rooftop only to see the band stage dive down. While Luna, Angel and Emma run towards the cruise liner, Marie appears to be standing behind the guard rail, wearing a red evening dress. Meanwhile, police snipers get into position.

As the Bandits reach the gangway, Kommissar Schwarz addresses them with a bullhorn.
Facing the police, they draw their weapons and throw them away. Kommissar Schwarz, however, misinterprets the move and orders the police snipers to shoot. Realizing his mistake, he looks shocked, while shots are heard. The film ends with Marie's hand reaching down to the hands of Luna, Angel and Emma.

Reception
Rotten Tomatoes reports 88% approval of Bandits among eight critics.

Attempted remake
Warner Bros. Pictures purchased the rights for an American remake of the film in 1998. Bill Gerber and John Wells were signed on to produce. von Garnier was also attached as producer and was even considered to direct, but she declined, claiming that she already had her dream casting for the movie. Several other directors, such as Joel Schumacher, were considered before music video director Nancy Bardawil was attached to direct in 2002, while Susan Skoog wrote the script. No further development was reported afterwards.

Awards
1998 Bavarian Film Award for best music.
1998 German Film Award Best Actress (Katja Riemann)
1999 Grand Prize at the 10th Yubari International Fantastic Film Festival

References

External links

1997 films
1990s musical films
German musical films
1990s German-language films
1990s English-language films
Films set in Hamburg
Films about musical groups
1990s chase films
Films directed by Katja von Garnier
1990s German films